The first edition of the Tour of Flanders, a cycling race in Belgium, was held on 25 May 1913. Paul Deman won the event in a five-man sprint before Joseph Van Daele and Victor Doms. The event was created by sports journalist Karel Van Wijnendaele and organized by sports newspaper Sportwereld.

It finished on the velodrome of Mariakerke, a wooden track built around a pond, with four final laps before the official finish. 37 riders started the race, there were 16 classified finishers.

Route
The race started in Ghent, East Flanders, before heading eastward to Sint-Niklaas and making a clockwise circle along Aalst, Oudenaarde, Kortrijk and Veurne. Subsequently, the course followed the North Seashore until Ostend and headed east via Roeselare back to Ghent. With this route, the race addressed all the major cities of the two western provinces of Flanders. There were no categorized climbs.

Results

References

External links

Tour of Flanders
1913 in road cycling
1913 in Belgian sport
May 1913 sports events